Maximianopolis ("city of Maximianus") can refer to the following ancient cities, named after the Roman emperor Maximian:

 Maximianopolis in Arabia, in modern Syria
 Maximianopolis (Osrhoene), in modern Turkey
 Maximianopolis (Palestine), in modern Israel
 Maximianopolis (Pamphylia), in modern Turkey
 Maximianopolis in Rhodope, in modern Greece
 Maximianopolis (Thebaid), in modern Egypt

See also 
 Maximianus (disambiguation)
 Maximiana, Maximianae
 Maximopolis (various cities)